The Jakobsspitze is a mountain in the Sarntal Alps in South Tyrol, Italy.

References 
 Hanspaul Menara: Südtiroler Gipfelwanderungen. Athesia, Bozen 2001, 
 Topografische Wanderkarte, Monti Sarenti / Sarntaler Alpen, Blatt 040, 1:25.000, Casa Editrice Tabacco, 

Mountains of the Alps
Mountains of South Tyrol
Sarntal Alps